Sergentia is a genus of European non-biting midges in the subfamily Chironominae of the bloodworm family Chironomidae.

Species
S. albescens (Townes, 1945)
S. baueri Wülker, Kiknadze, Kerkis & Nevers, 1999
S. coracina (Zetterstedt, 1850)
S. prima Proviz & Proviz, 1997
S. koschowi (A.A. Akers, 1996)

References

Chironomidae
Diptera of Europe